Henry Cowper (1668–1707), of Strood Park, Slinfold, Sussex, was an English politician.

He was a Member (MP) of the Parliament of England for Horsham from February to November 1701 and from 1702 to 22 March 1707.

References

1668 births
1707 deaths
People from Slinfold
English MPs 1701
English MPs 1702–1705
English MPs 1705–1707